Greg Mattison (born November 15, 1949) is a former American football coach, and former player. He spent most of his career in college football as a defensive coach. Mattison coached at Michigan for eleven years, at Notre Dame for seven years, at Florida for three years, including the 2006 national championship team, Ohio State, where he served two years. He also served as a defensive assistant for the Baltimore Ravens of the NFL.

Coaching career
At Florida, he served as co-coordinator of the defense with Charlie Strong. Charlie Strong also served as assistant Head Coach and Linebackers coach while Greg also pulled double duty working as the defensive line coach.  During this time he was a part of a successful defense and team that went overall 31-8 in games played and won a national championship by beating Ohio State 41-14 in the BCS Championship game in 2006.

Prior to his time at Florida, Mattison coached at University of Notre Dame from 1997 to 2004 as the defensive coordinator under Bob Davie until the Ty Willingham era (during which he served as defensive line coach and recruiting coordinator).  Prior to his time at Notre Dame, Mattison coached the defensive line at the University of Michigan from 1992 to 1996, while also serving at the defensive coordinator in 1995 and 1996.  During his time at Michigan, the Wolverines led the Big Ten Conference in rushing defense four consecutive seasons, holding opponents to 78.6 rushing yards per game in 1992, 87.9 in 1994, and 88.1 in 1995.  Mattison's charges also led the conference in total defense twice and scoring defense once.  He also coached with Coach Davie at Texas A&M University from 1988 to 1991 while Davie was defensive coordinator.  Under head coach R. C. Slocum, the Aggies featured the "Wrecking Crew", a nickname for one of the nation's top-ranked defenses.

On January 26, 2009, Mattison was promoted to defensive coordinator of the Baltimore Ravens; he was the successor of former defensive coordinator Rex Ryan.
He was the team's linebackers coach, a job he got in part due to his relationship with John Harbaugh.  During his time at WMU, Mattison coached alongside John Harbaugh, who was a graduate assistant and assistant coach.  Harbaugh, then head coach of the Baltimore Ravens, hired Mattison to coach the Ravens linebackers.  The job was Mattison's first NFL coaching position in 37 years of coaching football.

On January 18, 2011, the Ravens announced that Mattison had accepted the defensive coordinator position at the University of Michigan. In returning to Michigan, Mattison reunited with Michigan head coach Brady Hoke, who is a close friend of Mattison's and was the Wolverines' defensive ends coach during Mattison's previous stint as defensive coordinator at Michigan. His contract at Michigan made him among the highest paid college football assistant coaches in the country.
He was selected as one of five finalists for the 2011 Broyles Award.

Mattison was a finalist for the head coaching job at Western Michigan University following the 2004 season, a job that eventually went to Bill Cubit. Mattison had served as the defensive coordinator and linebackers coach under Jack Harbaugh at Western Michigan from 1981 to 1986.

On January 7, 2019 it was announced that Ohio State would be hiring Mattison to replace former defensive coordinator Greg Schiano.

Early life and family
Mattison is a graduate of the University of Wisconsin–La Crosse, where he played football and wrestled.  He attended high school at Madison East High School in Madison, Wisconsin.

Mattison's son, Bryan Mattison, was a senior captain for the 2007 Iowa Hawkeyes football team, and most recently played for the Kansas City Chiefs, but was released on May 2, 2013 and is currently a free agent.  He was previously a member of the Baltimore Ravens and the St. Louis Rams.

Sources

External links

 Ohio State profile

1949 births
Living people
Baltimore Ravens coaches
Cornell Big Red football coaches
Florida Gators football coaches
Illinois Fighting Illini football coaches
Michigan Wolverines football coaches
Navy Midshipmen football coaches
Northwestern Wildcats football coaches
Notre Dame Fighting Irish football coaches
Ohio State Buckeyes football coaches
Texas A&M Aggies football coaches
Western Michigan Broncos football coaches
Wisconsin–La Crosse Eagles football players
National Football League defensive coordinators
Wisconsin–La Crosse Eagles wrestlers
Sportspeople from Madison, Wisconsin
Players of American football from Wisconsin
Madison East High School alumni